Austrofusus is a genus of medium-sized sea snails or whelks, marine gastropod molluscs in the family Buccinidae, the true whelks.

Description
Two extant species Austrofusus glans and A. chathamensis are endemic to New Zealand waters, but most species are extinct and there is an abundant fossil record within the country.

Evolution
Austrofusus glans is not closely related to other extant New Zealand buccinid whelks, and is instead related to the Northern Hemisphere genus Colus.

Species
Species within the genus Austrofusus include:

 † Austrofusus acuticostatus (Suter, 1917)
 † Austrofusus affiliatus (Finlay, 1926)
 † Austrofusus allani (King, 1934)
 † (Neocola) Austrofusus alpha (Finlay, 1926)
 † (Neocola) Austrofusus apudalpha (Finlay, 1926)
 † (Neocola) Austrofusus beta (Finlay, 1926)
 † Austrofusus bicarinatus (Suter, 1917)
 Austrofusus chathamensis (Finlay, 1928)
 † Austrofusus claviculus (King, 1933)
 † (Neocola) Austrofusus cliftonensis (Marwick, 1926)
 † Austrofusus coerulecens (Finlay, 1930)
 † Austrofusus cottoni (King, 1933)
 † (Neocola) Austrofusus demissus (Marwick, 1931)
 † (Neocola) Austrofusus flexuosus (Marshall, 1918)
 † (Neocola) Austrofusus gamma (Finlay, 1926)
 Austrofusus glans (Röding, 1798)
 † Austrofusus latecostatus (Suter, 1917)
 † Austrofusus magnificus (Finlay, 1926)
 † Austrofusus marshalli (King], 1933)
 † (Neocola) Austrofusus marwicki (King, 1933)
 † (Neocola) Austrofusus ngatuturaensis (Bartrum & Powell, 1928)
 † (Neocola) Austrofusus oneroaensis (Powell & Batrum, 1929)
 † Austrofusus pagoda (Finlay, 1924)
 †Austrofusus pliocenicus (Powell,  1931)
 † Austrofusus precursor (Finlay, 1926)
 † Austrofusus soliarius (Dell, 1950)
 † Austrofusus spiniferus (Finlay & McDowall, 1923)
 † Austrofusus taitae (Marwick, 1924)
 † Austrofusus valedictus (King, 1935)
 † (Neocola) Austrofusus zitteli (Suter, 1914)

Species brought into synonymy
 † Austrofusus propenodosa Bartrum, 1919: synonym of † Zelandiella propenodosa (Bartrum, 1919)

References

Further reading
 Powell A. W. B., New Zealand Mollusca, William Collins Publishers Ltd, Auckland, New Zealand 1979

External links
 Bartrum, J. A., and A. W. B. Powell. "Mollusca from Kaawa Creek beds, west coast, south of Waikato River." Transactions of the New Zealand Institute. Vol. 59. 1928

Buccinidae